Fairfield College Preparatory School (Fairfield Prep) is a Jesuit preparatory school located on the campus of Fairfield University in Fairfield, Connecticut. It is an all-male school of about 700 students, founded by the Society of Jesus in 1942.

History
The bishop of Diocese of Bridgeport brought the Jesuits to the diocese in 1942 with the purchase of the adjoining estates of Jennings and Lashar off North Benson Road in Fairfield. The school began operations first; the university followed in 1947.  Prep was first accredited by the New England Association of Schools and Colleges in 1945.

The prep campus proper is on the east-central side of the university and has its own sports field, while having use of university facilities for many activities. The three, conjoined Prep buildings occupy a hill overlooking Long Island Sound on the 200-acre campus it shares with the university.

Students come from 51 towns across Connecticut, with the majority of the students from Bridgeport, Trumbull, Stratford, Norwalk, and Fairfield. Ten percent are students of color. The tuition for the 2017–2018 school year was $19,800. Approximately 25% of Prep students share in more than $2.5 million (2017) in financial aid.

Program 
All students are required to purchase an iPad for class use. Peer tutors are provided to students from members of the National Honor Society.

Qualifying students are admitted to honors courses. Seventeen advanced placement (AP) courses are offered at Prep. Seniors who excel in math, science, and foreign languages are permitted to take courses next door at Fairfield University, at no additional tuition. Admission to the university library is also permitted to Prep students.

Prep has entered a program whereby (coed) students from Überlingen, Germany, spend two weeks in Spring with the family of a Prep student, attending classes at Prep, and the family is welcomed to visit the German student's home in June.

Prep activities include 69 clubs described on its website.

Service 
Freshmen conduct a field day for inner-city children and may choose to participate in an immersion experience among immigrant workers in Immokalee, Florida. In sophomore year students contribute 20 hours of service, with a variety of community needs to choose from. For juniors several options are offered requiring at least 30 hours of service. These include: a two-day "Urban Plunge" retreat living and working with the poor; an immersion experience in Immokalee, Appalachia, Jamaica, or Ecuador; and a trial experiences at a few sites where the student might perform his senior service hours. Seniors are required to be involved in service throughout the year and a year-long reflection class is conducted in connection with this service.

Athletics
Fairfield College Preparatory School is part of the Quinnipiac Division in the Southern Connecticut Conference.  The school fields 15 varsity sports including football, soccer, cross country, basketball, ice hockey, swimming & diving, wrestling, skiing, baseball, lacrosse, track & field, rugby, golf, crew, and sailing. Prep's athletic teams have won 49 CIAC state championships and numerous other state titles in non-CIAC sports.  Over the years many athletes have won individual CIAC state titles in cross country, track & field, swimming & diving, wrestling, tennis, and golf.

Hockey
Prep has won 18 state championships, the most recent in 2019 where Prep defeated Notre Dame West Haven 5–2 at the Yale Whale.  Prep has had four players work their way up to the National Hockey League, including Chris '94 and Ted Drury '89, Jaime Sifers '01 and Mark Arcobello '06. Matt Sather '93 has coached the hockey team since 1999, leading it to eleven state championships. Since 1991, there has not been a 4-year class at Prep that has not won a state title in hockey.

Swimming and diving
Prep posted three straight undefeated regular seasons from 2007 to 2009 and won the CIAC Class L Championship in 2007.  The Jesuits placed second behind rival Greenwich High School in the CIAC Class LL Championship in each season since the Class L title in 2007.  In 2012, Fairfield Prep finished undefeated for the first time since 2009, and won their 8th straight SCC championship.  The team won the 2012 Class LL and State Open Championships. Fairfield Subsequently lost Conference Championships in 2020 and 2021 to rival Xavier High School from Middletown.

Lacrosse
Prep's lacrosse program has won six state titles since 2006 with three runner-up finishes during that time.  The team won most recently in 2013, beating Staples High School, for the school's 5th state championship. Christopher Smalkais coached the team for 33 years from 1983 to 2016 and won six state championships. He was inducted into the Connecticut Lacrosse Hall of Fame in 2013.  His introduction speech was given by 2011 Hall of Fame Inductee Howard Benedict, longtime New Canaan High School Lacrosse coach and a '63 Fairfield Prep alumnus.

Tennis
Prep's tennis team has won 10 state team championships, with the most recent in 2003.  Todd Paul, Class of 2003, won the Class LL Singles Championship four years in a row.

Rugby
Prep Rugby has been perennial contenders under Coach Frank Decker, and have been runner-up in every state championship match except one. Arch rival Greenwich High School won the championship each year. Prep rugby has many notable alumni, including Kenneth Stern '06 who attended Boston University and plays for the Philippines national team, and Will Brazier '01 who attended Fairfield University and played for the USA Tomahawks and the USA Falcons. In April 2016 Prep sponsored the first annual North-East Jesuit Rugby Tournament, and prevailed over five other Jesuit schools. They have won 3 out of 4 Northeast Jesuit Tournaments.

Rival
Prep's rival is Xavier High School.

Notable alumni

Jeff Davis (writer) - creator and director of the popular shows Criminal Minds and Teen Wolf
Peter J. Denning '60 - computer scientist
Felly '12 - rapper
Kevin Heffernan '86 - actor/comedian/film writer/attorney (Broken Lizard)
Pat Jordan '59 - acclaimed author of A False Spring, ranked #37 on Sports Illustrated's Top 100 Sports Books of All Time
Kevin Kallaugher '73 - cartoonist for the Economist magazine
George F. Keane - founder of the Common Fund
Stephen Kellogg '94 - musician, Stephen Kellogg & the Sixers
Robert Kowalski '58 - logician
William J. Lavery '55 - Chief Judge, Connecticut Appellate Court
Justin Long '96 - actor and spokesman for Geico
Mike McGlone '91 - actor and spokesman for Geico
Sean McManus '73 - President, CBS News and CBS Sports
Brian Monahan '78 - Attending Physician of the United States Congress and Rear Admiral in the United States Navy
Peter Sarsgaard '89 - actor
Yohuru Williams - dean of Fairfield University College of Arts and Sciences
Peter Cuong Franklin - modern Vietnamese cuisine chef

Notable alumni distinguishing themselves in athletics include:
Mark Arcobello - professional hockey player, SC Bern
Will Brazier '01 - rugby player with USA Tomahawks and USA Falcons
Chris Drury '94 - professional hockey player, 1998-99 NHL Rookie of the Year, Member of Team USA in Winter Olympics
Craig Kinsley '07 - 2012 London Olympic track and field athlete
Matt Merullo '83 - major league catcher
Mike Porzio '90 - MLB player (Colorado Rockies, Chicago White Sox)
Bob Skoronski '52 - professional football player, Offensive Captain of Green Bay Packers Super Bowls I & II Champions

Notable former faculty

John McLaughlin - television talk show host and advisor to President Richard Nixon
Francis A. Sullivan - Jesuit theologian and ecclesiologist
Charles F. Miller - Jesuit theologian and doctor

References

External links
 
 Roman Catholic Diocese of Bridgeport

Boys' schools in the United States
Educational institutions established in 1942
Buildings and structures in Fairfield, Connecticut
Schools in Fairfield County, Connecticut
Roman Catholic Diocese of Bridgeport
Catholic secondary schools in Connecticut
Jesuit high schools in the United States
1942 establishments in Connecticut